The NanoBook is an ultra-mobile PC reference design by VIA Technologies, Inc. It has a clamshell form factor, a 7-inch 800×480 touchscreen display, and a full-size keyboard. It weighs less than 850g (approximately 1.87 lb) and has a claimed battery life of up to 4.5 hours. It is based on the VIA VX700 chipset, featuring the VIA UniChrome Pro II IGP integrated graphics and powered by the 1.2-GHz VIA C7-M ultra low voltage processor. It includes up to 1GB DDR2 memory, a minimum 30-GB hard drive, 802.11g WiFi, Bluetooth and Ethernet support, as well as a 4-in-1 card reader, a DVI port and two USB 2.0 ports.

The company's press release stated that, "[to] provide users with additional flexibility when they are on the move, the VIA NanoBook also features a USB slot next to the screen that will enable the snap-in integration of a variety of World Time Clock/Calendar, GPS, VOIP, and broadband wireless modules."

The NanoBook was "targeted at aggressive consumer price points", and was available starting in the second half of 2007 through global OEMs and SIs.

Specification
Overview of the VIA NanoBook UMD reference design specification from VIA's web site:
Processor: 1.2GHz VIA C7-M ULV (Ultra Low Voltage) Processor
Chipset: VIA VX700 System Media Processor (integrated North & South Bridge)
Memory: DDR2 SO-DIMM up to 1GB
30-GB HDD
Display: 7-inch 800×480 touchscreen TFT LCD
Graphics: VIA UniChrome Pro II IGP Integrated 3D/2D Graphics with shared memory up to 64 MB
Audio: VIA Vinyl VT1708A HD Audio codec; 2 speakers
Networking:
Ethernet: Realtek RTL8100CL 10/100 Mbit/s
Wireless LAN: Azure Wave 802.11b/g (USB interface)
Bluetooth: Billionton (USB interface)
I/O:
4-in-1 Card Reader
1× DVI-I port
2× Hi-Speed USB2.0 ports
1× RJ45 Ethernet port
Audio jacks:
1× Mic-in audio jack
1× Array Microphone jack
1× Headphone (line out) jack
Status Indicator: Power On; Battery; RF (with power button); HDD; Caps Lock
Battery: 4 cells for up to 4.5 hours of battery life (BatteryMark 2004)
Dimensions: 230 mm (W) × 171 mm (D) × 29.4 mm (H)
Weight: Under 850 g
Operating System Support: Supports Microsoft Windows XP, Windows Vista and all popular Linux distributions

Netbooks Nanobook-based
Apricot Picobook Pro
Aristo Pico 740
Astone UMPC CE-260
Belinea s.book 1
Blue Thunder BT260
Elonex Websurfer
Everex CloudBook
Everex Cloudbook CE1200V
Everex Cloudbook CE1201V
Everex Cloudbook SC1200T
Everex Cloudbook CE1200J
iDOT CE260
Packard Bell Easynote XS
Pioneer Dreambook Light CE26
Sungju TangoX Nano
Surcouf La Révolution
Sylvania g
Zyrex Ubud

See also
ASUS Eee PC
Palm Foleo
Ultra-Mobile PC
VIA OpenBook

References

External links
VIA NanoBook UMD Reference Design
VIA introduces NanoBook Ultra Mobile Device a $600 ultraportable laptop

Laptops
Ultra Mobile PC
VIA Technologies
Netbooks